Ode to Gallantry is a Taiwanese television series adapted from Louis Cha's novel of the same title. The series was broadcast on CTS in Taiwan in 1985.

Cast
 Max Mok as Xiaogouzi / Shi Zhongyu
 Chao Yung-hsin as Ding Dang
 Chao Chia-jung as A'xiu
 Chou Hsiao-yun as Shi Jian
 Chang Fu-chian as Xie Yanke
 Chang Feng as Bai Zizai
 Lung Lung as Shi Qing
 Yeh Chia-ling as Min Rou
 Huang Chung-yu as Tianmo
 Tseng Ya-chun as Mei Fanggu
 Lu I-lung as Bei Haishi
 Ma Hui-chen as Shi Xiaocui / Shi Popo
 Hou Po-wei as Ding Busan
 Chiang Sheng as Ding Busi
 Yeh Fei as Bai Wanjian
 Sung Chang-chiang as Bai Wanren
 Ming-kuang as Hua Wanxu
 Yu-shang as Ouyang Wuzui
 Hsu Wen-jui as Geng Wanzhong
 Tso Yao-hu as Pidan
 Han Hsiang-chin as Liu Ruyan
 Cheng Hui-hung as Lady Feng
 Wang Wei-chiang as Feng Wanli
 Chen Sung-jung as Cult leader

See also
 Ode to Gallantry (film)
 Ode to Gallantry (1989 TV series)
 Ode to Gallantry (2002 TV series)

Works based on Ode to Gallantry
Taiwanese wuxia television series
1985 Taiwanese television series debuts
1985 Taiwanese television series endings
1980s Taiwanese television series
Television shows based on works by Jin Yong